The National Institute for Interdisciplinary Science and Technology (NIIST, formerly Regional Research Laboratory, Trivandrum) is a constituent laboratory of CSIR, India, engaged in research and development activities in the field of agroprocessing and technology, microbial processes and technology, chemical sciences and technology, material sciences and technology and process engineering and environmental technology. Around approximately 80 scientists and 300 research fellows are working in various scientific disciplines in this institute. The programmes have a blend of basic research, technology development and commercialization; have specific thrusts on frontier areas of research, National Mission Projects, regional resource-based activities and R & D - Industry - Academia linkages. The laboratory has excellent collaborative programmes with major National & International agencies too. the present director of the institute is Dr. A. Ajayaghosh.

It was established in 1975 as a CSIR Complex, then named as the Regional Research Laboratory in 1978 and later renamed as NIIST in 2007.

Research divisions 
The major research divisions in NIIST are:
1. Agroprocessing and technology division (APTD)

2. Microbial processes and technology division (MPTD)

3. Chemical sciences and technology division (CSTD)
 Inorganic Materials
 Organic Chemistry
 Photosciences and Photonics
4. Materials science and technology division (MSTD)

5. Environmental technology division

Materials Science and Technology division has divided into Functional Materials and Minerals and Metallic Materials sections.

Functional Materials has activities related to nano-ceramics, energy materials, polymeric materials, electronic materials and magnetic materials.  
 Nano-ceramics
 Energy Materials
 Polymeric Materials
 Electronic Materials
 Magnetic Materials
Minerals and Metallic Materials has activities related to metals and minerals.
 Light Metals, Alloys and Composites
 Minerals

Agroprocessing division
This is the division in charge of undertaking research in developing innovative technologies for processing of oil seeds, spices and natural products. The core competence of the division is in process and product development and on the transformation of such processes into fully engineered technology packages for commercial exploitation. The division has set up a number of commercial plants in many states and extended technical expertise in making policy decisions in relevant areas by governmental and non governmental agencies. Technology Business Incubation Centre (TBIC) in the area of spices and natural products contribute towards development of innovative technologies. Major research includes quality improvement of palm oil, spice oil/ oleoresins, swing technology for processing of fresh and dry spices, Refrigeration Adsorption Dehumidified Drying (RADD) of heat sensitive materials, Ginger oil extraction, and nutraceutical studies.

References

External links
 Official website of NIIST
 Official website of CSIR
 A Search Engine from NIIST -  SSIR

Council of Scientific and Industrial Research
Research institutes in Thiruvananthapuram
Multidisciplinary research institutes
Scientific organisations based in India
Science and technology studies associations
1975 establishments in Kerala
Research institutes established in 1975